RSS Vengeance (93) is the sixth ship of the Victory-class corvette of the Republic of Singapore Navy.

Construction and career 
Vengeance was launched on 23 December 1990 by ST Engineering and was commissioned on 25 May 1991.

During Workyear 2003/2004, she was awarded Best Ship Award and Operational Excellence Award by the navy.

RSS Vengeance took part in the inaugural Exercise Bersama Padu, a joint Five Power Defence Arrangements (FPDA) exercise, in 2006.

References 

1990 ships
Ships built in Singapore
Victory-class corvettes